Pokolbin may refer to:
 Pokolbin, New South Wales, a locality in the Hunter Region of New South Wales, Australia
 A wine-producing region in the Hunter Region